Verret (/ˈvɜːrɛt/), commonly known as Verrett or Verrettville, is a unincorporated community in St. Bernard Parish, Louisiana, United States. The community was originally established as a freedmen's town by formerly enslaved African Americans.

In 2018, a Louisiana state historical marker was placed at the First Baptist Church of Verrettville in recognition of its significance in addition to the importance of community founder Rev. Samuel Smith.

References 

Unincorporated communities in St. Bernard Parish, Louisiana